The list that follows is the Liberal Democrats frontbench team led by Paddy Ashdown, who was party leader from 1988 to 1999. Initially known as a frontbench team, the Lib Dems began to refer to their Frontbench Team as a "Shadow Cabinet" during the leadership of Ashdown's successor, Charles Kennedy, although the use of the term is controversial.

Liberal Democrat Frontbench team
Leader of the Liberal Democrats - Paddy Ashdown
Deputy Leader with responsibility for the strategic direction of the Party in Parliament - Alan Beith
Chief Whip and Shadow Leader of the House - Paul Tyler
Deputy Whip - Andrew Stunell
Whips -
Edward Davey
Donald Gorrie
Adrian Sanders
Party President - Robert Maclennan
Agriculture and Rural Affairs - Charles Kennedy
Food - Paul Tyler
Fisheries - Andrew George
Constitution - Robert Maclennan
Spokesman for English Regions - Nick Harvey
Scotland - Jim Wallace
Wales - Richard Livsey
Culture, Media and Sport/Civil Service - Robert Maclennan
Arts and Broadcasting - Robert Maclennan
Tourism - Ronnie Fearn
Sport - Nigel Jones
Disabled People - Paul Burstow
Education and Employment - Don Foster
Nursery Education and Schools; Labour market statistics - Don Foster
Further, higher and adult education - Phil Willis
Employment and training - Paul Keetch
Environment and Transport -
Matthew Taylor
Norman Baker
Tom Brake
Sir Robert Smith
Andrew Stunell
Foreign Affairs, Defence and Europe - Menzies Campbell
Foreign and Commonwealth, Europe and Defence - Menzies Campbell
Defence - Mike Hancock
Europe - David Heath
International Development - Jenny Tonge
Health - Simon Hughes
Future of the NHS - Simon Hughes
Public Health - Peter Brand
NHS Staff, organisation and planning - Evan Harris
Home and Legal Affairs - Alan Beith
Home Affairs - Alan Beith
Community relations and urban affairs - Richard Allan
Legal Affairs (Attorney General; Solicitor General; Lord Chancellor) -
John Burnett
Bob Russell
Local Government and Housing - Paul Burstow
Local Government (Social Services and Community Care) - Paul Burstow
Local Council Liaison - Paul Burstow
Jackie Ballard
Adrian Sanders
Trade and Industry - David Chidgey
Employment, Social Chapter and Minimum Wage - David Chigley
Science and Technology - David Chigley
Competition - Nigel Jones
Small Business -
Colin Breed
Brian Cotter
Treasury -
Malcolm Bruce
Edward Davey
Vince Cable
Wales -
Richard Livsey
Lembit Opik
Women - Jackie Ballard
Young People - Lembit Opik

Liberal Democrats in the House of Lords
Leader in the Lords - The Lord Jenkins of Hillhead
Chief Whip - The Lord Rodgers of Quarrybank

External links
Weekly Information Bulletin: 28 November 1998, www.parliament.uk

Ashdown
Politics of the United Kingdom
1990s in the United Kingdom
1988 establishments in the United Kingdom
1999 disestablishments in the United Kingdom
British shadow cabinets
1997 in British politics